The Taylor Centre for the Performing Arts (TCPA) is performing arts centre located on the campus of Mount Royal University in Calgary, Alberta, Canada. Completed in 2015, it is home to the 787-seat Bella Concert Hall.

History 
The idea of a new performing arts centre to accommodate the growing Mount Royal Conservatory was planned as far back as 1999, but did not move forward until construction began in 2011. The creation of the TCPA was made possible by a $21 million donation from Don Taylor of the Taylor family, which spurred further donations, such as from the federal government ($20 million), the provincial government ($20 million), and the municipal government ($10.3 million). Additional funding came from financing, donors, and university reserves for a total of $19.2 million in additional funds.

Construction began in 2011 and took 4 years to complete. The centre opened in July 2015, except for the Bella Concert Hall, which opened in August 2015. The total cost came to over $90 million.

See also 
 List of concert halls

References 

Buildings and structures completed in 2015
Mount Royal University
Concert halls in Canada
Buildings and structures in Calgary